Long Player is the second album by the British rock group Faces, released in February 1971. Among the highlights are a live cover version of Paul McCartney's "Maybe I'm Amazed", the ballads "Richmond" and "Sweet Lady Mary", the party tune "Had Me a Real Good Time", and uptempo saloon bar rocker "Bad 'n' Ruin". Two tracks, "Maybe I'm Amazed" and "I Feel So Good", were recorded live at the Fillmore East, New York on 10 November 1970.

Background
A unique early mix of "Had Me A Real Good Time" appeared as a single ahead of the LP in November 1970, backed with the non-album instrumental "Rear Wheel Skid". While the latter track was eventually compiled to CD with the release of the Five Guys Walk into a Bar... box set of 2004, the different early mix of the a-side remains confined to the single and early vinyl editions of Snakes and Ladders / The Best of Faces in 1976.

A distinct studio recording of "Maybe I'm Amazed" also appeared as the a-side of a standalone non-LP single release in the USA just ahead of the album itself. This track and it's non-LP instrumental b-side "Oh Lord, I'm Browned Off" were prized rarities among Faces collectors until they too were both compiled on the "Five Guys" set.

Also recorded during this period was the band's cover of The Temptations' "(I Know) I'm Losing You" which later appeared on lead singer Rod Stewart's solo album Every Picture Tells a Story rather than on Long Player or as a Faces single release. This practice led to increased murmurings of discontent in some quarters that Stewart's management was keeping the best Faces studio performances for Stewart's solo projects, to the detriment of the band as a unit. While the sessions for both albums did unquestionably overlap, Stewart's dual recording contracts with different labels, as both a solo artist and as a member of the Faces, complicated matters greatly. This led to the odd situation where his Faces colleagues could only be credited individually and not explicitly as 'Faces' for their efforts on his solo albums at the time. As it was, their performance on the track was heavily implied, with a 'thank-you' from Stewart in the LP's liner notes. To further confuse matters, however, the track was then released as a single credited to 'Rod Stewart and the Faces', but only in the USA. Despite being widely regarded as one of the band's finest studio performances, this original version has never been compiled as part of any collection that deals purely with Faces material as it falls outside of their Warner Brothers contract. It has however since appeared - and usually with full credit to the band - on many Stewart solo compilations.

On 28 August 2015, the "Long Player" album was reissued in a remastered and expanded form, including two previously unreleased outtakes, "Whole Lotta Woman" and  "Sham-Mozzal" (the latter actually being an early instrumental prototype of "Had Me A Real Good Time"). Two more live tracks from the Fillmore East show were also included. The reissue used the U.S. cover artwork. It was also released at the same time in the above form as part of the complete recordings box set 1970-1975: You can Make Me Dance, Sing Or Anything. The album's companion singles (aside that is from the unique mix of "Had Me A Real Good Time" as detailed above) were included in the box set on an exclusive CD of rarities.

Track listing

All lead vocals by Rod Stewart except where noted

Side One
"Bad 'n' Ruin" (Ian McLagan, Rod Stewart) - 5:30
"Tell Everyone" (Ronnie Lane) - 4:22
"Sweet Lady Mary" (Lane, Stewart, Ronnie Wood) - 5:40
"Richmond" (Lane) - 3:05 (lead singer: Ronnie Lane)
"Maybe I'm Amazed" [Live at Fillmore East, New York 11/10/70] (Paul McCartney) - 5:35 
(lead singers: Rod Stewart, Ronnie Lane)

Side Two
"Had Me a Real Good Time" (Lane, Stewart, Wood) - 5:50
"On the Beach" (Lane, Wood) - 4:15 (lead singers: Ronnie Lane and Ron Wood)
"I Feel So Good" [Live at Fillmore East, New York 11/10/70] (Big Bill Broonzy) - 8:50
"Jerusalem" (instrumental) (Hubert Parry, William Blake - arr. Wood; erroneously credited as traditional) - 1:55

2015 Reissue bonus tracks
 "Whole Lotta Woman" (Marvin Rainwater)
 "Tell Everyone" [Take 1] (Lane) (lead singer: Ronnie Lane)
 "Sham-Mozzal" [embryonic instrumental version of "Had Me A Real Good Time"] (Jones, Lane, McLagan, Wood)
 "Too Much Woman (For A Henpecked Man)" [Live at Fillmore East, New York 11/10/70] (Ike Turner)
 "Love In Vain" [Live at Fillmore East, New York 11/10/70] (Robert Johnson)

Note: Sweet Lady Mary incorrectly listed as 5:30 on record sleeve.

Charts

Personnel
Track numbering refers to CD and digital releases of the album.
Rod Stewart - lead vocals
Ronnie Lane - bass, acoustic guitar, percussion, backing vocals, lead vocal [tracks 4 & 7, first verse/harmony on track 5]
Ronnie Wood - lead, slide, acoustic and pedal steel guitars, backing vocals, co-lead vocal [track 7]
Ian McLagan - piano, organ and keyboards, backing vocals
Kenney Jones - drums and percussion
Bobby Keys - tenor saxophone on "Had Me a Real Good Time"
Harry Beckett - trumpet on "Had Me a Real Good Time"
Faces - production

Other information
Track numbering refers to CD and digital releases of the album.
Tracks 1 and 2 recorded with the Rolling Stones Mobile Studio. Engineered by Martin Birch.
Tracks 3, 4, 6 and 9 recorded at Morgan Sound Studios, London. Engineered by Mike Bobak.
Tracks 5 and 8 recorded live at Bill Graham's Fillmore East, New York. Engineered by Dave Palmer.
Track 7 recorded with Revox spare room unit. Engineer unknown.
The album sleeve was originally a stitched-together facsimile of bootleg records as well as the old style 78 RPM singles, with the record label showing.
The album was reissued in the mid 1970s as part of the double album 'Two Originals of The Faces' with record one being 'First Step'.
Notes of dates for the live tracks use the US dating system - songs were performed and recorded on 10 November 1970.

References

1971 albums
Faces (band) albums
Warner Records albums
Albums produced by Rod Stewart
Albums produced by Ronnie Lane
Albums produced by Ronnie Wood
Albums produced by Ian McLagan
Albums produced by Kenney Jones
Albums recorded at Morgan Sound Studios
Albums recorded in a home studio